Artemivsk is a place name in Ukraine, created from the name of the Soviet leader Artyom. It may refer to:

Populated places in Ukraine
 Former name of Bakhmut, a city in Donetsk Oblast, Ukraine
 Artemivsk, Luhansk Oblast, a city in Luhansk Oblast, Ukraine formerly known as Katerynivka, and officially renamed Kypuche by the Ukrainian government

Others
 Artemivsk, former small amphibious ship (type Zubr-class LCAC, prior to 1996 Soviet MDK-123), retired in 2000
 Artemivsk, one of the territorial defense battalions